Pambəyi (along with, Pambahi, Pambagi, and Pombagi) is a village that forms a part of the municipality of Osakücə, Azerbaijan.

References 

Populated places in Lankaran District